Renaissance (RE),  or sometimes called simply En Marche ! as its original name, is a liberal and centrist political party in France. 
The party was previously known as La République En Marche !, translated as "The Republic on the Move" or "Republic Forward").

The party was founded on 6 April 2016 by Emmanuel Macron, a former Minister of the Economy, Industry and Digital Affairs, who was later elected president in the 2017 French presidential election with 66.1% of the second-round vote. Presented as a pro-European party, Macron considers LREM to be a progressive movement, uniting both the left and the right. Following that year's presidential election, the party ran candidates in the 2017 French legislative election, including dissidents from the Socialist Party (PS) and the Republicans (LR) as well as minor parties. It won an absolute majority in the National Assembly, securing 308 seats.

LREM accepts globalisation and wants to "modernise and moralise" French politics, combining social and economic liberalism. The movement generally accepts members from other parties at a higher rate than other political parties in France, and does not impose any fees on members who want to join. The party has been a member of Renew Europe, the European parliamentary group, since June 2019.

History

Foundation 
La Gauche Libre, the think tank for the movement, was declared as an organization on 1 March 2015. Afterwards, lesjeunesavecmacron.fr was registered as a domain on 23 June 2015. Eventually, two Facebook pages were created and an extra domain registered. Another organization was eventually created by Macron, declared as L'Association pour le renouvellement de la vie politique and registered as a micro-party in January 2016. This was following en-marche.fr being claimed as a domain. L'Association pour le renouvellement de la vie politique was then registered as EMA EN MARCHE in March 2016.

En Marche! was founded on 6 April 2016 in Amiens by Emmanuel Macron, then aged 38, with the help of political advisor Ismaël Emelien. The initials of the name of the party are the same as the initials of Macron's name.

The announcement of En Marche! was the first indication by Macron that he was planning to run for President, with Macron using En Marche! to fundraise for the potential presidential run. The launch of the party was widely covered throughout the media and media coverage continued to peak as tensions rose among Macron and other government ministers as his loyalty was questioned. In the weeks following the creation of En Marche!, Macron soared in the opinion polls, coming to be seen as the main competitor on the left.

The creation of En Marche! was welcomed by several political figures including Najat Vallaud-Belkacem, Jean-Pierre Raffarin and Pierre Gattaz, although it was also criticised by Jean-Luc Mélenchon and Christian Estrosi.

In an attempt to create the party's first campaign platform, Macron and head of operations Ludovic Chaker recruited 4,000 volunteers to conduct door-to-door surveys of 100,000 people, using the information gained to create a programme closer to the French electorate.

Later that year, Chaker structured the movement and became the first general secretary of Emmanuel Macron's party En Marche! and its first official employee. He was then appointed as deputy general secretary and coordinator of Macron's campaign operations for the 2017 French presidential election.

2017 legislative election 

La République En Marche! ran candidates in most constituencies. At least half its candidates came from civil society, the other half having previously held political office and half were women. Candidates could not be selected for more than one constituency. In addition to those parameters, Macron specified in his initial press conference on 19 January that he would require that candidates demonstrate probity (disqualifying any prospective candidates with a criminal record), political plurality (representing the threads of the movement) and efficacy. Those wishing to seek the endorsement of LREM had to sign up online and the movement received nearly 15,000 applications.

When dealing with nominations sought by those in the political world, the party considered the popularity, establishment and media skills of applicants, with the most difficult cases adjudicated by Macron himself. To present themselves under the label of La République En Marche!, outgoing deputies had to leave the Socialist Party (PS) or the Republicans (LR). Macron previously said the legislative candidates would have to leave the PS before they could join LREM, though on 5 May 2017 Macron waived this requirement. However, then-spokesperson of LREM Christophe Castaner later said they could stay in the PS as long as they supported Macron. Moreover, spokesperson Jean-Paul Delevoye said the members of civil society could be mayors or members of regional councils and departmental councils.

After François Bayrou endorsed Macron in February, the Democratic Movement (MoDem), which he leads, reserved 90 constituencies for MoDem candidates (running under the label of La République En Marche!), of which 50 were considered winnable.

On 15 May 2017, the secretary general of the presidency announced the appointment of Édouard Philippe, a member of LR, as Prime Minister.

On 18 June 2017, La République En Marche! won an absolute majority in the National Assembly, securing 308 seats (or 53% of the seats) while collecting only 28.21% of the vote on the first round, and 43.06% on the second round. Additionally, MoDem secured 42 seats. LREM became France's party of power, in support of the President.

2017 Senate election and first party congress 
In the 2017 Senate election, La République En Marche! lost seats, ending up with 21, seven fewer than before. While hoping to double its representatives in the senate, party officials have noted that due to the elections electoral system of indirect universal suffrage, where deputies, senators and regional councilors elect senators, the party had a disadvantage due to being new.

In the same month, the first party congress was announced to be held in Lyon. The first gathering of party adherents and representatives, party spokesman, Christophe Castaner announced his candidacy on 25 October 2017 with the endorsement of President Macron, allowing him to run unopposed. The congress took place on the 19 November 2017 and Castaner was elected the Executive Officer and leader of the party by a council of 800 people, with a quarter being adherents of the party. Castaner's term will last three years. The congress generated media attention for criticism surrounding it, including a walk-out done by attendees of the congress where hundred attendants unanimously resigned from the party due to accusations of a lack of internal democracy and corruption.

The first by-election of 15th National Assembly of France in Val-d'Oise's 1st constituency's, which was a La République En Marche! seat, was up for contention after it was ruled that deputy Isabelle Muller-Quoy's replacement Michel Alexeef was ineligible under electoral code. Muller-Quoy won the first round by 18 percentage points in 2017 and won the first round by only 5 percentage points in the by-election, going onto lose the seat to the LR candidate Antoine Savignat. The race was the first loss the party had endured in the National Assembly. Several subsequent by-elections following showed a 10% overall swing against La République En Marche! since the June 2017 legislative elections.

2019 European Parliament election 

LREM was expected to sign a cooperation agreement with the ALDE group for the 2019 European Parliament election. However, owing to the Gilets Jaunes protests and the rise of national populism within France, Macron opted to run a campaign focusing more on electing representatives of his party to the European Parliament, than campaigning for ALDE. Macron styled his campaign as "Renaissance", calling for a renaissance across Europe. Following the election, the ALDE parliamentary group reformed into Renew Europe, incorporating Macron's Renaissance, along with others.

2020 municipal elections 
For the 2020 municipal elections, LREM set itself the objective of obtaining 10,000 municipal councilors (out of a total of 500,000 elected). The party invested 592 heads of the list in towns with more than 9,000 inhabitants, including 289 belonging to members.

Between the two rounds, the party formed 76 alliances with the right and 33 with the left in towns with more than 9,000 inhabitants; alliances are notably formed with right-wing lists against Europe Ecology – The Greens or union lists on the left, in large cities such as Bordeaux, Strasbourg and Tours. LREM leaders justify this imbalance by the fact that the outgoing right-wing mayors are more numerous given the success of the right in the 2014 elections; Marie Guévenoux, co-president of the national investiture commission of LREM, affirms to have “even rather want to forge alliances on the left, but that was not possible” because the majority on the left didn't want.

Confident after the electoral results of the legislative and European elections, the party did not conquer any large city at the end of the poll and only had 146 mayors supported or invested in municipalities with more than 9,000 inhabitants and 4 in municipalities with more than 30,000 inhabitants.

In many cities, the ruling party was relegated to third or even fourth place. As expected, in Paris as in Lyon, important place for the movement, the LREM candidates suffered serious setbacks. The defeat is all the stronger where the candidates had allied themselves with right-wing mayors, as in Bordeaux. The French ecologists won the majority of the metropolitan cities that the party wanted to win. "It is no longer a green wave, it is a tsunami," said an employee of the party after the election. "The danger for 2022 is the rise of the Europe Ecology – The Greens," said a local official.

A combination of circumstances symbolic of the difficulties encountered by La République en Marche during this campaign, marked in particular by a certain embarrassment to display the LREM logo on posters in the midst of the yellow vests movement, social conflict on pensions, climate strikes, as well as the management of the COVID-19 crisis did not calm the rejection of the party.

2022 legislative election 

In May 2022, LREM announced that it would change the name of its parliamentary group to Renaissance. In September, the party also switched its name to Renaissance.

Ideology 
Although Macron was a member of the PS from 2006 to 2009 and an independent politician from 2009 to 2016, La République En Marche! seeks to transcend traditional political boundaries to be a transpartisan organisation.

Various sources have described the party as being centrist, centre-right, or big tent. Macron has described it as being a progressive party of both the left and the right. Observers and political commentators have described the party as being socially liberal, as well as economically liberal in ideology. The party has also been described as using anti-establishment, populist strategies and  rhetoric, with discourse comparable to the Third Way as adopted by the Labour Party in the UK during its New Labour phase. The party has been described as supporting some policies close to centre-right classical liberalism.

According to an Ipsos survey conducted in March 2018, some public perception of the party has moved to the right since March 2017, with 45% of respondents classifying the party as being centre-right (25%) to right-wing (20%). 21% of respondents place it in the centre, compared to 33% in March 2017.

Associate parties

Organisation

Membership 

 considers every person who submits identification information (date of birth, email, full address and telephone number) and adheres to the party's charter to be an adherent. Unlike other political parties, it does not require adherents to make a monetary donation. Macron has indicated that it is possible to adhere to  while remaining a member of another republican party.

On 10 April 2016, a few days after the movement's launch, Macron claimed 13,000 adherents.  accused him of inflating the figure and claimed that 13,000 was in reality the number of clicks that Macron had received on his website. , Macron's advisor, clarified that "each adherent signs a charter of values and has a voice in the movement's general assembly" and that "that has nothing to do with those who sign up for the newsletter, who are much greater in number". , another of Macron's advisors, affirmed that the movement verifies the email addresses of adherents but conceded that "the system relies on the honesty of each adherent".

In October 2016, Macron affirmed that  was "neck and neck with the Socialist Party" in terms of membership after only seven months of existence. Many of its members had never been engaged in politics. However, the majority had only shown interest by leaving their information on the party website.

By relying on a participatory political model, each  adherent has the opportunity to freely join or create a local committee. Each of these committees is led by one or more adherents who organize the committee by planning local events, meetings and debates centered around the ideas and values promoted by the movement.  counted more than 2,600 of these committees in December 2016.

Finance 
Christian Dargnat, former general director of BNP Paribas Asset Management, leads the La République En Marche! financial association. Since its creation, the association has raised funds for the party. In 2016, Georges Fenech, a deputy of the Republicans, alerted the National Assembly that the association had continued fund raising even during Macron's trip to London. This led Prime Minister Manuel Valls to issue an official denial even though En Marche! had already done so. Macron declared in May 2016 that 2,000 donors had already contributed financially to the party. In December 2016, he spoke of more than 10,000 donors from 1 euro to 7,500 euros. By the end of December 2016, he had collected between 4 and 5 million euros in donations. At the end of March, this figure exceeded 9 million euros from 35,000 donations, averaging 257 euros per donation. 600 donors made up half of the total amount donated, with donations upwards of 5,000 euros.

In the book Dans l'enfer de Bercy: Enquête sur les secrets du ministère des Finances (JC Lattès, 2017) by journalists Frédéric Says and Marion L'Hour, Macron was accused of using 120,000 euros from the state budget from 1 January to 30 August 2016 in order to fund his presidential campaign.

European representation 
In the European Parliament, La République En Marche sits in the Renew Europe group with five MEPs.

In the European Committee of the Regions, La République En Marche sits in the Renew Europe CoR group, with three full members and one alternate member for the 2020–2025 mandate. Anne Rudisuhli is Coordinator in the SEDEC Commission and Magali Altounian is Deputy Coordinator in the ECON Commission.

Election results

Presidential elections

Legislative elections

European Parliament

Symbols

See also
 La République En Marche group (Senate)
 Liberalism and radicalism in France
 List of political parties in France
 Renaissance group

Footnotes

References

Further reading 
 Elgie, Robert. "The election of Emmanuel Macron and the new French party system: a return to the éternel marais?." Modern & Contemporary France 26.1 (2018): 15–29.
 Gil, Cameron Michael. "Spatial analysis of La République En Marche and French Parties, 2002–2017." French Politics (2018): 1-27.
 Gougou, Florent, and Simon Persico. "A new party system in the making? The 2017 French presidential election." French Politics 15.3 (2017): 303–321.

External links
 
  

 
2016 establishments in France
Political parties established in 2016
Centrist parties in France
Centre-right parties in Europe
Classical liberal parties
Liberal parties in France
Political parties of the French Fifth Republic
Pro-European political parties in France